U-KISS is a South Korean boy band formed in 2008. Their name is an acronym, standing for Ubiquitous Korean International Idol Super Star. The group's current lineup is composed of Soohyun, Hoon, Kiseop and Jun.

Their breakthrough hit was "Man Man Ha Ni" (2009) from their EP ContiUKiss. They released their first full-length album, Only One, on February 3, 2010. In September 2011, U-KISS released their second full-length album, Neverland. They made their formal debut in Japan in 2011 with the release of the single "Tick Tack". Their second Japanese single was "Forbidden Love", while their first Japanese full-length album was A Shared Dream (2012).

Since their debut, U-KISS has released three full-length albums, twelve mini-albums/EPs, one special mini-album (created for their fans), and various singles. They have released seven Japanese full-length albums, one Japanese compilation album, and five Japanese mini-albums/EPs. The group and individual members have also participated in various musicals, radio programs, web shows, TV series, and films.

The group has recorded and/or performed songs in Korean, Japanese, Chinese, English and Spanish. U-KISS has earned six entries on Billboard's World Albums chart and has had 9 songs on the K-pop Hot 100 chart.

In 2012, U-KISS was the first K-pop group to hold a fan meeting in Cambodia. During that same year, U-KISS was not only the first K-pop act, but also the first Asian group, to perform at the "Los 40 Principales" concert in Colombia. In 2013, U-KISS was the second Korean artist to hold a solo concert in Mexico. U-KISS was also one of the first K-pop groups to release original albums in Japanese. In Japan, they ranked #1 on the Oricon Albums Chart with Action in 2015.

History

2008: Formation and Debut 
U-KISS was formed as a six-member boy band in 2008. Kibum and Kevin were previously members of the boy band XING, but had left that group in early 2007. The other four members were all individually selected by NH Media through auditions.U-kiss did their first showcase(mini-live) in August16th(originally planned to be on July 27) Tokyo Takeshiba NONAME.

U-KISS first performed on August 15, 2008, at Power of Atamix 08 in Japan. The group officially debuted in South Korea on August 28, with a live performance of their debut song, "Not Young", on Mnet. This was followed by the release of their first mini-album, New Generation (N-Generation), on September 3.

Although they were newcomers in the industry,  U-KISS was considered for a Japan-Korea collaborative project. A Japanese entertainment company, Yashimoto Group, invested 150 billion KRW to develop U-KISS into an internationally known group.

2009–2010: Line-up change, Only One, and first tours

On February 3, 2009, U-KISS released their second mini-album Bring It Back 2 Old School, with the title song "I Like You", which gained them popularity, especially in Thailand.

On November 6, their third mini-album, ContiUKiss, launched Kiseop as the seventh member of the group. The title track, "Man Man Ha Ni", was released following the change in their line-up.

On February 3, 2010, the group's first full-length album, Only One, was released, generating their highest chart-topping single in the Philippines, "Bingeul Bingeul". The song peaked at #2 on the MYX Music Channel Hit and International Top 20 charts for the period of April 25 - May 1. The support of Filipino fans helped it stay on the Philippines' MYX Music Channel charts for more than a month. The album also topped Hanteo Charts, Hot Tracks, Syn-nara Records, and Evan Records in just one day. U-KISS then played in Malaysia, Mongolia, and Japan to promote the album. U-KISS promoted the album in the Philippines through a series of mall shows, where they sold more than 1,000 copies in one day, breaking the record for the highest sales in a launch and earning a million pesos. Due to its success, the group had their first major concert in the Philippines, later released on DVD as U-KISS First Kiss Tour in Manila.

On October 4, their fourth EP, Break Time, was released along with the title track "Shut Up!". The U-KISS First Kiss Live in Tokyo & Osaka (2010) concerts were held December 6 in Osaka and December 10 in Tokyo. On December 10, their Japanese compilation album, First Kiss, placed #2 on the Oricon daily charts on the day of its release. In addition to their music career, U-KISS starred in their own variety shows, including All About U-KISS, UKISS Vampire, and Chef Kiss.

2011–2012:  Line-up changes, NEVERLAND, and Japanese debut 

In 2011, Soohyun was officially appointed the leader of U-KISS. Alexander and Kibum left the group, being replaced by former Paran member Kim Jae-seop (AJ) and a former solo artist, Yeo Hoon-min (Hoon). As a result, a U.S. album was canceled due to member termination of contract.

On March 30, the new formation of U-KISS released their fifth EP, Bran New Kiss, and a new ballad song, "0330". U-KISS released the Japanese version of Bran New Kiss on August 24. The EP reached #3 on Japan's daily Oricon Albums Chart. On September 1, U-KISS released their second full-length album, Neverland, with the singles "Neverland" and "Someday". At the Asia Song Festival in October, The Korea Foundation for International Culture Exchange selected U-KISS as an Asia Influential Artist. On December 14, U-KISS released their first Japanese single, "Tick Tack", which marked the group's official Japanese debut date after signing a contract with Avex Trax. Also in 2011, member AJ was accepted to Columbia University in the United States.

In 2012, U-KISS was chosen as the #1 Hallyu Group to Watch in Japan, while Kevin was chosen as the Luckiest Hallyu Star of 2012. On February 8, U-KISS participated in the Music Bank concert held in Paris, France. It featured a special presentation by Soohyun singing a duet with Sistar's Hyolyn of "Love Always Finds a Reason", with the original English lyrics. On February 29, U-KISS released their second Japanese single, Forbidden Love, simultaneously with their first Japanese full-length album, A Shared Dream. "Forbidden Love" ranked #9 on the Oricon Daily Single Chart, while A Shared Dream ranked #6 on the Oricon Daily Album Chart.

U-KISS held a sold-out concert tour, "U-KISS 1st Japan Live Tour 2012", in Zepp Hall venues across Japan. The tour lasted from March 2–25. In the second week of June, two additional shows were also sold out. The U-KISS Japan Live Tour "A Shared Dream" (2012) held performances on March 2 in Sapporo, March 4 in Sendai, March 10 in Osaka, March 11 in Fukuoka, March 17 in Nagoya, and March 24–25 in Tokyo.  Due to its success, more dates were added: July 7 in Hiroshima, July 8 in Osaka, July 14 in Sendai, July 16 in Nagoya, July 18 in Fukuoka, July 20 in Nagasaki, July 25 in Sapporo, July 27 in Niigata, and July 28–29 in Tokyo. A DVD titled U-KISS Days in Japan debuted at #8 on the Oricon Daily Chart published on March 30.

On April 25, U-KISS released their sixth EP in South Korea, DoraDora. In May, "DoraDora" gained the #1 spot on the German Asian Music Chart. On May 12, U-KISS became not only the first K-pop act, but also the first Asian group, to perform in Colombia at "Los 40 Principales" (the biggest pop concert in Latin America) along with Shakira. The group released their seventh EP, The Special to Kissme, on June 5. On June 1, the second single from it, "Te Amo", had been released on various music sites and immediately placed #4 on Soribada. On July 2, U-KISS performed at the 2012 K-POP Nation Concert in Macao, along with Girls' Generation and SHINee. U-KISS released their third Japanese single, "Dear My Friend", on July 5. It was used as the theme song for a Japanese anime movie, Stormy Night (Secret Friends). On July 29, it was announced during the Japanese Live Tour that AJ would be on hiatus for 5 months, and he would no longer attend U-KISS activities starting in August, in order to concentrate on his studies. According to NH Media, AJ would return in early 2013, therefore the U-KISS comeback in September 2012 would only feature six members.

Before AJ's temporary departure from the group, U-KISS attended the A-Nation opening ceremony at the Tokyo National Stadium on August 3. On August 9, 2012, U-KISS represented Korea in Asia Progress M, part of A-Nation, the biggest music festival in Japan. On August 26, the group also performed with Hamasaki Ayumi, M-Flo, and Big Bang at Ajinomoto Stadium.

On September 5, the group ended their Japanese tour with the U-KISS Japan Live In Budokan (2012), where they attracted an audience of 10,000, their biggest to date. Meanwhile, the group released their fourth Japanese single, "One of You", on September 5. During its first week, it peaked at #1 on the Tower Records weekly chart. On September 14, U-KISS received a special achievement award in recognition of their contribution to the Hallyu Wave. The group attended Arirang TV's celebration event for the milestone of reaching over 100 million clients. At the event, U-KISS was awarded the Special Hallyu Achievement Award from the minister of the Ministry of Culture, Sports, and Tourism. On September 20, the group released their seventh EP, Stop Girl, and planned to actively promote it in 10 countries including Thailand, the Philippines, the United States, and China. The mini-album also included an English version of the title track, "Stop Girl". U-KISS released their fifth Japanese single, "Distance", on December 12.

2013–2014: Collage and Line-up changes
On January 19, 2013, U-KISS participated in the Dream KPOP Fantasy Concert in Manila, Philippines. The Japanese single "Alone" was released on February 13. It was used as the theme song for NHK's TV drama, Bookstore Worker Michiru’s Personal Story. U-KISS released their third full-length album Collage on March 7, with the lead single, "Standing Still" (composed by Ryan Jhun), was released on March 6. The group also performed at the "Formula 1" event held at the Petronas Tower in Malaysia on March 22, sharing the stage with K-pop group 2NE1 and American artists Backstreet Boys and Demi Lovato.

The sub-unit uBEAT debuted at the end of April, composed of Eli and AJ, with Kevin featuring as the main vocalist. In June, U-KISS went on tour in Latin America, traveling to Peru, Colombia, and Mexico. The group became the second Korean artist to have a solo concert in Mexico, after JYJ's Junsu. All 4,000 tickets were sold out, and fans who couldn't buy tickets sang along with the songs outside the concert hall. U-KISS performed a Spanish version of "Dear My Friend", specially prepared for their Latin American fans. Just the previous year, U-KISS had launched their official South American fan club.

Avex Trax announced that U-KISS would release their second full-length Japanese album, "Inside øf Me", on July 24. The U-KISS Japan Live Tour "Inside Of Me" (2013) held performances on July 27 in Yokohama, July 30–31 in Tokyo, August 7 in Fukuoka, August 12–13 in Osaka, August 22 in Hokkaido, August 26 in Tokyo (added because two previous Tokyo concerts sold out), and August 30 in Aichi. In October 2013, Dongho was leaving the group, due to health and personal issues. On October 30, U-KISS released their eighth EP, Moments, along with the music video for “She’s Mine”. This single mixed R&B and hip-hop, which were genres that the group hadn't tried before. On December 15, U-KISS participated in the 15th Korea-China Music Festival in Beijing. It featured a special presentation by Soohyun singing a duet with Wanting Qu of "You Exist in My Song", with the original Chinese lyrics.

In January 2014, U-KISS toured America, making stops in New York, San Francisco, and Los Angeles. Presales of VIP tickets sold out in just 30 seconds for the Los Angeles date, and eight minutes for the one in New York. U-KISS also made media appearances along the way, including an interview on ABC's national TV program, Good Morning, America. On May 15, NH Media introduced new member Jun through U-KISS' official Korean website to replace the positions of AJ due hiatus for continued his studies at Columbia University. On June 2, Jun made his debut with UKISS. They released their 9th EP, Mono Scandal, along with the 19+ rated MV for "Quit Playing". With this song, U-KISS become the first boy band to be temporarily banned from broadcast in South Korea for “inappropriate choreography”, causing them to make changes to the original dance routine.

The "U-KISS JAPAN LIVE TOUR 2014" started with a performance in Tokyo on July 16, toured 12 cities, and attracted a total of about 120,000 attendees. U-KISS finished the tour with their 2nd performance at the Budokan on September 12, which was called "U-KISS Japan ～Returns in Budokan～". The U-KISS "Scandal" In Europe Tour (2014) held performances on September 21 in Moscow, September 24 in London, and September 28 in Paris. In Paris, they were the subject of an exclusive video documentary.

2015: Always
U-KISS made an appearance on M! Countdown with a performance of their single "Playground" on January 22, 2015. This single was later released along with their tenth mini-album, Always, on January 23. On March 3, U-KISS accepted SBS MTV's The Show - China Choice award for "Playground", their 1st trophy won on a weekly music show. U-KISS' 4th Japanese album, Action, was released on March 18. It charted #2 on the Oricon Daily Chart the day of release, and then topped the chart at #1 on the day after release. It also ranked at #4 on the Oricon Weekly Chart, with 20,297 copies sold.

The U-KISS Japan Live Tour "Action" (2015) held performances on August 16 in Osaka, August 18–19 in Tokyo, August 22 in Hokkaido, August 24–25 in Aichi, August 27 in Osaka, August 28 in Fukuoka, and August 30 in Miyagi. U-KISS released their 11th Japanese single, "Stay Gold", on September 9. It charted #2 on the Oricon Daily Chart and #3 on the Oricon Weekly Chart, with a total reported sales of 44,418. On December 23, U-KISS continued their Japanese promotions with the release of their first Christmas mini-album, simply titled The Christmas Album.

2016–2017: Stalker and Line-up changes
On February 23, 2016, U-KISS released their 12th Japanese single Kissing to Feel, and their fifth Japanese album, One Shot One Kill, on March 23. U-KISS' 11th Korean EP, Stalker, was released on June 7. On August 29, AJ announced that his contract had expired with NH Media, and he officially left the group. The U-KISS Japan Best Live Tour ～5th Anniversary Special～ (2016) held performances on December 2 in Fukuoka, December 4 in Hiroshima, December 9–10 in Hyogo, December 15 in Aichi, December 23 in Miyagi, and December 25 in Kanagawa.

On March 2, 2017, Kevin announced his official departure from the group after his contract had expired with NH Media. U-KISS continued to be active as a five-member group. Soohyun and Eli, the remaining original members, renewed their contracts with NH Media. On May 5, U-KISS was the headline act for a K-pop concert that was a finale of the week-long Seoul Food Festival. They were supported by their label mates, Laboum. U-KISS contributed a song, "RUN A WAY", to the OST for KBS2's TV drama Manhole, which aired August–September and starred Jaejoong from JYJ. On August 20, 2017, U-KISS performed at The Star of Asia music festival in Kazakhstan, where they were presented with a special prize trophy during the broadcast on KAZAKH TV. On September 6, NH Media reported that Kiseop had suffered second degree burn injuries due to an explosion that took place during the group's "FLY" music video filming. They went on to explain that ten fragments of material had become lodged in his body and that he had been transferred to a hospital in Incheon to receive treatment.

U-KISS held a tour of Japan called "U-KISS LIVE EVENT 2017 ~Stay with U~", performing September 30 in Chiba, October 7 in Saitama, and October 9 in Osaka. On October 10, U-KISS' Japanese single, “FLY”, ranked #3 on the daily Oricon Singles Chart. This achievement was even more meaningful because all the members took part in producing the EDM-influenced song and its accompanying tracks. U-KISS contributed an English-language cover version of Shakira's "Try Everything" (from the movie Zootopia) to the compilation album Thank You Disney, which was released on October 25. On November 20–21, U-KISS held the "2017 U-KISS FANMEETING IN KOREA ~KISS HOLIC~". On December 9, U-KISS put on a special concert in Tokyo for an ongoing endorsement with CHIC-Smart electric scooters. On December 26, U-KISS released a Korean digital single, “Ready for U”. On December 28, Soohyun enlisted in the Army for his mandatory military service.

2018–2019: 10th anniversary and members departure
On March 31, 2018, U-KISS released their 7th Japanese full-length album, LINK, which included songs recorded by Soohyun before his enlistment. It ranked #3 on the daily Oricon Albums Chart. All the members of U-KISS (including Soohyun, who was on temporary leave from military duty) celebrated the 10th anniversary of their Korean debut. On October 10, the group returned with their 15th Japanese single "Scandal", which ranked #8 on the Billboard Japan Hot 100 chart. On December 19, U-KISS released their 8th Japanese full-length album, Glory, which featured a Christmas song for the title track. The song was used in an endorsement for Huis Ten Bosch, one of the biggest theme parks in Japan.

On March 18, 2019, Hoon enlisted in the Marine Corp for his mandatory military service. On May 16, nhemg (NH Media) announced that Eli and Kiseop left the group after their contracts expired with the agency. On September 1, Soohyun completed his mandatory military service and was discharged from the Army. Soon after, "Soohyun & Jun (from U-KISS) Fan Meeting in SEOUL ～autumn memory～" was held on September 22–23. To honor the 8th anniversary of U-KISS' Japanese debut on December 14, Soohyun will hold an anniversary talk and video screening of "JUN (from U-KISS) 1st Event 2019 ~Phenomenal World~" in Tokyo.

2020-present: Reunions and departure from NH Media 
Kevin temporarily rejoined U-KISS as a duo with Soohyun as part of a special throwback-themed "Guilty Pleasures" concert from SBS and its variety show MMTG in October 2020. The duo also performed "Shut Up!!" with Teen Top in a special collaboration stage.

On October 20, Hoon completed his mandatory military service and be discharged from the Marine Corp. On October 21, 2020, Soohyun and Jun released the Japanese single 'Eyes on Me', which also contained the Ballad track '星も見えない夜に'.

U-KISS' second sub-unit, Soohyun & Hoon, was formed and released the single 'I Wish' in both Korean & Japanese in 2021. The Korean version was released on January 27, and the Japanese version on February 24. Soohyun left NH Media on April 15 following his contract expiration, however he stated he will remain as part of U-KISS. In August, Hoon and Jun also left NH Media after their contracts expired.

On January 24, 2022, Soohyun, Hoon, and Kiseop signed exclusive contracts with Tango Music, with Kiseop officially rejoining U-KISS. In May 2022, U-KISS launched a YouTube channel official and announcement of various activities.

Philanthropy

On June 7, 2011, U-KISS – along with other K-pop groups including 2NE1, MBLAQ, 4Minute, F.T. Island and B2ST – held a special show called "Seoul-Osaka Music of Hearts", raising funds to help victims of the 2011 Japan earthquake. Earlier in March of that year, U-KISS had volunteered to take part in another fundraising concert put on by veteran Korean singers for the same cause, where they worked together with several boy and girl bands to answer donation phone calls.

On June 18, 2012, U-KISS became the first K-pop group to hold a fan meeting in Cambodia, called "Share The Love Charity Concert". The fan meeting led to a charity organization in a nearby school, where members interacted with the children, passing out baseball bats and other baseball equipment. The show, as a part of the benefit project, was sponsored by famous Cambodians and was even attended by the prime minister of Cambodia, Hun Sen.

On February 1, 2013, Soohyun and Kevin hosted a charity event for Jakarta after the heavy flooding in Indonesia. They auctioned 2 CDs, with which they interacted to raise the value, along with clothing that they'd worn. Two albums were auctioned live, with total proceeds of Rp3.500.000 (roughly US$350). The two members also held a press conference explaining why their showcase would be postponed to April. Along with the press conference, they also visited Pluit, where they held the charity session and interacted with kids who were affected by the flooding.

On June 6, 2016, U-KISS revealed that a portion of the proceeds from their Stalker album sales would be donated to the Culture and Arts Education Division of AbleArt Center, which helps handicapped artists.

After 2022 Russian invasion of Ukraine U-KISS become the first K-Pop group to publicly announce and provide support for Ukraine. U-KISS members Soohyun, Kiseop, and Hoon donated 10 million KRW (about $8,200 USD) on March 3, 2022.

Endorsements 

Photos of the members were featured on Visa credit cards issued by The Sumitomo Mitsui Banking Corporation (one of Japan's top three banks). Card users accumulated points that could be redeemed for U-KISS merchandise. U-KISS was the first K-pop band to be featured on Sumitomo's Visa cards. U-KISS also collaborated with Dresscode Inc to create special clothing for their Korean album, Only You.

Members

Current 
 Soohyun (수현)
 Hoon (훈)
 Kiseop (기섭)
 Jun (준)

Former
 Alexander (알렉산더)
 Kibum (기범)
 AJ (에이제이)
 Kevin (케빈)
 Dongho (동호)
 Eli (일라이)

Timeline

Discography 

Korean albums
 Only One (2010)
 Neverland (2011)
 Collage (2013)

Japanese albums
 A Shared Dream (2012)
 Inside øf Me (2013)
 Memories (2014)
 Action (2015)
 One Shot One Kill (2016)
 U-KISS Solo & Unit ALBUM (2017)
 Link (2018)
 Glory (2018)

Filmography

Reality shows
 2009: You Know U-KISS
 2009: All About U-KISS
 2010: U-KISS Vampire
 2010: Chef KISS
 2013: U-KISSme?
 2013: Kanzume!! TV Magazine Show
 2014: Go U-KISS!
 2014–present: U-KISS no Teatarishidai
 2019: U-KISS no MassisoU

Awards and nominations

References

External links

 Official website 

 
South Korean boy bands
Musical groups established in 2008
Avex Trax artists
K-pop music groups